Dark Waters is a 1944 American Gothic film noir based on the novel of the same name by Francis and Marian Cockrell. It was directed by Andre de Toth and starred Merle Oberon, Franchot Tone, and Thomas Mitchell.

Plot
Leslie Calvin, the shaken survivor of a ship sunk by a submarine, travels to her aunt and uncle's Louisiana plantation to recuperate, but her relatives have other ideas. Thomas Mitchell, who played the congenial Gerald O'Hara in Gone With the Wind, is a mysterious and fussy guest at the plantation. In a subtle nod to Gone With the Wind, the aunt tells Leslie that "Tomorrow is another day."

Cast

Reception
The film was generally well received as accomplishing what it intended, with the New York Times stating it was "neatly produced and directed – and well played by an excellent cast."

Critical response
Slant Magazine's film critic, Glenn Heath Jr., liked the film writing, "Mood dictates narrative in Andre de Toth's Dark Waters, a hallucinatory jigsaw puzzle set in the deep swamps of 1940s Louisiana that becomes a perfect breeding ground for noirish shadows and deceptive wordplay ... Dark Waters ends with multiple dead bodies sinking into the bayou and Leslie directly confronting what one character calls her "persuasion complex." The bravura finale through the oozing locale is a stunner, and despite some surface romance that feels a bit forced, the film stays true to its mystically dark mood, a slithering distant cousin to Tourneur's I Walked with a Zombie.

See also
List of American films of 1944

References

External links
 
 
 
 Dark Waters informational page and DVD review at DVD Beaver (includes images)
 Dark Waters film at Hulu (free and complete)

1944 films
1940s English-language films
1940s psychological thriller films
American black-and-white films
American psychological thriller films
Film noir
Films based on American novels
Films directed by Andre DeToth
Films scored by Miklós Rózsa
Films set in Louisiana
Films set on the home front during World War II
Southern Gothic films
United Artists films
1940s American films